Holy Orders is a 1917 British silent romance film directed by A.E. Coleby and Arthur Rooke and starring Malvina Longfellow, Maud Yates and Arthur Rooke. It was adapted from the 1908 novel Holy Orders, The Tragedy of a Quiet Life by Marie Corelli.

Cast
 Malvina Longfellow ...  Jacynth 
 Maud Yates ...  Jenny Kiernan 
 Arthur Rooke ...  Reverend Richard Everton 
 A.E. Coleby ...  Dan Kiernan 
 Tammy White ...  Azalea Everton 
 Terence Boddy ...  Lawrence

References

External links

1917 films
1917 romantic drama films
British romantic drama films
British silent feature films
Films directed by Arthur Rooke
Films based on British novels
Films based on works by Marie Corelli
British black-and-white films
1910s English-language films
1910s British films
Silent romantic drama films